Iowa Highway 370 (Iowa 370) was a state highway which connected Nebraska Highway 370 (N-370) to Interstate 29 (I-29) / U.S. Highway 275 (US 275) south of Council Bluffs.  Iowa 370 crossed the Bellevue Bridge over the Missouri River at Bellevue, Nebraska.  The entire route was within  of Council Bluffs and downtown Omaha, Nebraska.

Route description
It began on the Bellevue Bridge where N-370 crossed the Missouri River. The highway cut through farmland shaped by the meandering river's course. Iowa 370 ended at exit 42 along I-29 / US 275.

History

Designated in 1953, Iowa 370 originally extended  from Bellevue, Nebraska, to US 275.  The eastern end of the route was in Pottawattamie County.  In the early 1980s, Iowa 370 was truncated at I-29.  The segment in Mills County from I-29 to the Pottawattamie County line was inventoried as Iowa 935 until July 1, 2003.

Upon completion and opening of the new US 34 bridge over the Missouri River, Iowa 370 was turned over to Mills County.

Major intersections

References

370